The Opening Round, subtitled The Groove Masters Series Vol. 1 is an album by saxophonist Houston Person which was recorded in 1997 and released on the Savant label.

Reception

In his review on Allmusic, Stewart Mason states "A fun and personable mix of jazz and soul classics plus a couple of originals by guitarist Rodney Jones, Houston Person's The Opening Round: Groove Masters Series, Vol. 1 isn't a jazz album for the ages, but it's start-to-finish entertaining. It's a straight-up groove album, with Person in front of a four-piece organ combo". In JazzTimes, Stanley Dance wrote: "Person’s thick, unmannered tone, love of melody and swing, together give his music an odd sobriety that he seems compelled to relieve with fast flurries of notes".

Track listing 
 "Sweet Sucker" (Johnny Griffin) – 1:27
 "Let's Stay Together" (Al Green, Al Jackson Jr., Willie Mitchell) – 3:56
 "Can't Help Lovin' That Man" (Jerome Kern, Oscar Hammerstein II) – 4:06	
 "What's Going On?" (Marvin Gaye, Renaldo Benson, Al Cleveland) – 2:32	
 "When a Man Loves a Woman" (Calvin Lewis, Andrew Wright) – 3:41
 "Blue Spring" (Rodney Jones) – 4:35
 "Song for a Rainbow" (Jones) – 3:57
 "Shenandoah" (Traditional) – 4:55

Personnel 
Houston Person – tenor saxophone
Joey DeFrancesco – Hammond B3 organ
Rodney Jones – guitar
Tracy Wormworth – electric bass
Bernard Purdie – drums

References 

Houston Person albums
1997 albums
Savant Records albums
Albums recorded at Van Gelder Studio